Elia Benedettini (born 22 June 1995) is a Sammarinese footballer who plays as a goalkeeper for Cailungo and the San Marino national team. He is the cousin of San Marino goalkeeper Simone.

Club career
Benedettini began his career at San Marino Calcio in Lega Pro, the third tier of the Italian football system. He was first called up to a matchday squad on 24 September 2012, remaining an unused substitute in a 0–1 home loss against Pavia at the Stadio Olimpico in Serravalle. On 10 February 2013 he was called up again and remained unused in a 2–0 home win over PortoSummaga. His third call-up on 5 May resulted in his only appearance of the season, in a home match against Cremonese. Starting goalkeeper Mattia Migani was sent off in the second minute, so forward Francesco Cassola was substituted for Benedettini, who immediately conceded a penalty kick by Giuseppe Le Noci in an eventual 1–6 defeat.

On 21 July 2013, he joined Cesena for an undisclosed fee.

In July 2014, Benedettini moved to Serie D club Pianese.

In July 2016, he moved to Serie B club Novara on a free transfer. He made his competitive debut for the club on 24 December 2016 in a 4–1 away defeat to Virtus Entella. He was released by Novara by mutual consent on 9 October 2020.

On 14 January 2021, he returned to Cesena.

On 11 July 2022, Benedettini agreed to join Cailungo in Campionato Sammarinese di Calcio.

International career
He made his senior international debut for San Marino on 27 June 2015, in a UEFA Euro 2016 qualifying match against Slovenia in Ljubljana, a 0–6 defeat. Prior to this, he had played for San Marino's youth teams.

Career statistics

International

References

External links

Living people
1995 births
People from Borgo Maggiore
Sammarinese footballers
Association football goalkeepers
San Marino international footballers
A.S.D. Victor San Marino players
A.C. Cesena players
U.S. Pianese players
Novara F.C. players
Cesena F.C. players
S.P. Cailungo players
Serie B players
Serie C players
Sammarinese expatriate footballers
Sammarinese expatriate sportspeople in Italy
Expatriate footballers in Italy